The Admiral Was a Lady is a 1950 American comedy film directed by Albert S. Rogell and starring Edmond O'Brien and Wanda Hendrix. The working title of the film was Once Over Lightly, taken from one of the film's songs.

Plot 
After the end of World War II, Jean Madison, a former WAVE ensign, meets the former aircrew of an Army Air Corps A-20 Havoc light bomber named "Sinful Sinthia" when they go to collect their unemployment benefits. They are all members of the 52-20 Club, a government program that pays unemployed American veterans $20 a week for 52 weeks.

The men take Jean, whom Jimmy dubs the Admiral, under their wing, showing her how to save money. For example, they open bank accounts in order to receive a free ceramic piggy bank and get their $20 checks cashed, then close their accounts without having to pay a fee. They sell the piggy banks to a pawnbroker for 25 cents each. The gang lives free in an empty aircraft factory because Jimmy is the night watchman. Eddie artfully makes their furniture out of aircraft parts and other war surplus. They get their meals discounted for being stale or in trade, as when Mike stands in for the lifeguard at a private club. Former taxi driver Ollie drives them around in a sound truck from a local music store in exchange for providing advertising over a loudspeaker. All the while, Jean is secretly followed by a private detective.

When Jean learns that her fiancé Henry is returning to the United States, but has not even so much as mentioned her, she becomes upset and boards a bus for home.

Meanwhile, Jimmy is summoned to the office of Peter Pedigrew, the "Jukebox King." It was Pedigrew who had hired the private detective. He threatens to put the men to work, ending their idyllic lifestyle, unless they keep Jean from leaving for 24 hours. Pedigrew later explains that his ex-wife Shirley intends to marry Henry. Pedigrew wants to remarry Shirley (again) because, after two expensive divorces, she has most of his money, and he needs capital desperately to expand his business. Also, he is still irresistibly attracted to her, despite her being "so beautifully wicked". So, he wants the crew to help get Henry back together with Jean. Jimmy reluctantly agrees.

Jimmy races to the bus and gets Jean to stay by lying to her about Henry. As they spend time together, Jean discovers that the men are living with a dark secret. Jimmy feels guilty for Mike's injuries when their airplane crashed during the war. Jimmy, the former head of an employment agency, will not rest until all his crewmen have resolved things. Jimmy even takes Mike's place in a boxing match, since the injuries could kill Mike, though Jimmy has never been inside a ring in his life before.

In the end, Pedigrew catches up with Shirley, Henry comes for Jean, and Eddie realizes he needs to go home to find out if his girlfriend will love him, even if he is poor. Finally, Pedigrew agrees to set up Mike and Ollie in business. So, that only leaves Jimmy, who by now is in love with the Admiral. When the unseen Henry finally knocks on her door, she leaves it locked in favor of Jimmy.

Cast 

Edmond O'Brien as Jimmy Stevens
Wanda Hendrix as Jean Madison, the "Admiral"
Rudy Vallee as Peter Pedigrew
Johnny Sands as Eddie Hoff
Steve Brodie as Mike O'Halloran, the boxer
Richard Erdman as Oliver "Ollie" Bonelli
Hillary Brooke as Mrs. Shirley Pedigrew
Richard Lane as Marty Gruber, the fight promoter
Garry Owen as Watson Jones, the private detective
Fred Essler as Benny, the pawnbroker

Music
"Once Over Lightly" and "Everything That's Wonderful" were composed by Al Stewart and Earl Rose.

Home media
The film is in the public domain and widely available on DVD or online, with running times ranging between 83 and 87 minutes.

References

External links 

1950 films
1950 romantic comedy films
American romantic comedy films
1950s English-language films
Films directed by Albert S. Rogell
Films set in 1945
American black-and-white films
United Artists films
WAVES (Navy)
Films about veterans
1950s American films